The Phoenix is the second studio album from American R&B singer Lyfe Jennings. It features the lead single S.E.X, and was released on August 15, 2006. The album reached No. 2 on the U.S. albums chart and No. 1 on the US R&B chart, selling over 136,000 copies. The album features a remake of Tupac Shakur's "Keep Ya Head Up".

Track listing

Charts

Weekly charts

Year-end charts

References

External links 
 Official artist website
 Columbia Records website
 Sony BMG website 

2006 albums
Lyfe Jennings albums
Columbia Records albums
Hip hop albums by American artists